Midpines is a census-designated place in Mariposa County, California. The population was 379 at the 2020 census, down from 1,204 in 2010, when the CDP was drawn to cover significantly more area.

Midpines began as a resort, founded by Newell D. Chamberlain, in 1926. The first post office opened in 1929.

Geography
The community is in the valley of Bear Creek, which flows northwest to join the Merced River at Briceburg.

Demographics
The 2010 United States Census reported that Midpines had a population of 1,204. The racial makeup of Midpines was 990 (82.2%) White, 4 (0.3%) African American, 63 (5.2%) Native American, 7 (0.6%) Asian, 0 (0.0%) Pacific Islander, 97 (8.1%) from other races, and 43 (3.6%) from two or more races. Hispanic or Latino of any race were 208 persons (17.3%).

The Census reported that 1,204 people (100% of the population) lived in households, 0 (0%) lived in non-institutionalized group quarters, and 0 (0%) were institutionalized.

There were 511 households, out of which 126 (24.7%) had children under the age of 18 living in them, 244 (47.7%) were opposite-sex married couples living together, 37 (7.2%) had a female householder with no husband present, 32 (6.3%) had a male householder with no wife present.  There were 28 (5.5%) unmarried opposite-sex partnerships, and 8 (1.6%) same-sex married couples or partnerships. 159 households (31.1%) were made up of individuals, and 60 (11.7%) had someone living alone who was 65 years of age or older. The average household size was 2.36.  There were 313 families (61.3% of all households); the average family size was 2.88.

The population was spread out, with 229 people (19.0%) under the age of 18, 79 people (6.6%) aged 18 to 24, 285 people (23.7%) aged 25 to 44, 389 people (32.3%) aged 45 to 64, and 222 people (18.4%) who were 65 years of age or older.  The median age was 45.4 years. For every 100 females, there were 107.9 males.  For every 100 females age 18 and over, there were 108.8 males.

There were 627 housing units at an average density of 25.5 per square mile (9.9/km2), of which 318 (62.2%) were owner-occupied, and 193 (37.8%) were occupied by renters. The homeowner vacancy rate was 1.5%; the rental vacancy rate was 10.4%.  728 people (60.5% of the population) lived in owner-occupied housing units and 476 people (39.5%) lived in rental housing units.

References

External links
Full-size photo of "The Dragon"

Census-designated places in Mariposa County, California
Populated places in the Sierra Nevada (United States)
Populated places established in 1926
1926 establishments in California